Ogün Altıparmak (born November 10, 1938 in Adapazarı, Sakarya) is a former Turkish national football player who played for Fenerbahçe S.K.

He started his career in 1955 at Karşıyaka S.K. and then transferred to Fenerbahçe SK in 1963 with a broken leg. He helped Fenerbahçe win 4 Turkish League titles and 1 Turkish Cup title with Fenerbahçe and was the league's top scorer with 16 goals in 1970-71, the year he retired. He made 32 appearances on the Turkish National A Football Team.

Ogun also played for the Washington Whips in the 1968 North American Soccer League before returning to Fenerbahçe with a heroic performance in a 2-1 victory against Manchester City F.C., scoring the winning goal and assisting the equalizer after the Turks fell behind 1-0 in the first half, which ousted the English team from the European Champions Cup in October 1968.

International

International goals 
As of match played 11 December1968. Turkey score listed first, score column indicates score after each Altıparmak goal.

Personal life
His son Batur Altıparmak also played for Fenerbahçe in addition to Gaziantepspor, Ankaragücü and Şekerspor between 1990 and 2001. He is currently a FIFA footballer agent.

Awards
1955-63 Karşıyaka S.K.
Izmir Futbol Ligi: 1958-59
1963-68 Fenerbahçe
Balkans Cup: 1966-67
Turkish League:  1963-64, 1964–65, 1967–68
Turkish Cup: 1967
Presidents Cup: 1968
Atatürk Cup: 1964
Spor Toto Cup: 1967
1969-71 Fenerbahçe
Turkish League:  1969-70
 TSYD Cup: 1969
Turkish League Top Scorer: 16 goals in 1970-71

References

1938 births
Living people
Sportspeople from Adapazarı
Turkish footballers
Turkish expatriate footballers
Turkey international footballers
Association football agents
Washington Whips players
Fenerbahçe S.K. footballers
Karşıyaka S.K. footballers
Turkey youth international footballers
Turkey under-21 international footballers
Turkey B international footballers
North American Soccer League (1968–1984) players
Expatriate soccer players in the United States
Association football forwards